UEFA Euro 2022 may refer to:

 UEFA Women's Euro 2022, scheduled to be held in July 2022
 UEFA Futsal Euro 2022, scheduled to be held from January to February 2022
 UEFA Women's Futsal Euro 2022, scheduled to be held in July 2022